The Moore County Courthouse and Jail is a historic building complex in Lynchburg, Tennessee. It includes both the jail and the courthouse for Moore County, Tennessee. Designed in the Italianate architectural style, it is listed on the National Register of Historic Places.

History
The county jail was built on land owned by Colonel John M. Hughes, a veteran of the Confederate States Army during the American Civil War of 1861–1865. Its construction was completed in 1876, only five years after the establishment of Moore County. The construction team was Bobo and Stegall.

Between 1872 and 1880, the Grand Central Hotel owned by Dr. E Y. Salmon, another Confederate veteran who served as the county clerk/master, was the de facto county courthouse. Other meeting places included a church and a school in Lynchburg. Construction on the county courthouse across the square from the jail began in 1884, and it was completed within a year. The builder was S.L.P. Garrett.

Architectural significance
The jail was designed with a gablet roof, and the courthouse was designed in the Italianate architectural style. They have been listed on the National Register of Historic Places since September 26, 1979.

References

Buildings and structures on the National Register of Historic Places in Tennessee
National Register of Historic Places in Moore County, Tennessee
Victorian architecture in Tennessee
Gothic Revival architecture in Tennessee
Government buildings completed in 1885